The Premio San Román Muxika is a cyclo-cross race held in Muxika, Spain.

Past winners

References
 Results pt.1
 Results pt.2

Cyclo-cross races
Cycle races in the Basque Country
Recurring sporting events established in 2001
2001 establishments in Spain
Sport in Biscay